Sedbergh is a civil parish in the South Lakeland District of Cumbria, England. It contains 165 listed buildings that are recorded in the National Heritage List for England. Of these, two are listed at Grade I, the highest of the three grades, 13 are at Grade II*, the middle grade, and the others are at Grade II, the lowest grade.  The parish is in the Yorkshire Dales National Park.  The major settlement is the small town of Sedbergh, and there are smaller settlements including Millthrop, Catholes, Marthwaite, Brigflatts, High Oaks, Howgill, Lowgill and Cautley.  The parish contains a large area of countryside, and many of the listed buildings are farmhouses and farm buildings.  In the town is Sedbergh School and a number of the school buildings are listed.  Elsewhere in the town, most of the listed buildings are houses and associated structures, and shops.  Other listed buildings in the parish include churches and associated structures, bridges, milestones, a hotel, a viaduct, a drinking fountain, memorials, and two telephone kiosks.


Key

Buildings

References

Citations

Sources

Lists of listed buildings in Cumbria
Listed